Karbelian was a region and family of the old Armenia  400–800. The main known ruler is Arten Karbelian  451.

See also
List of regions of ancient Armenia

Early medieval Armenian regions